The Loughborough Riders are a basketball team based in the town of Loughborough, England. The Riders compete in NBL Division 1, the second tier of the British basketball system. The programme was reestablished in 2011 and is primarily based on the Loughborough University team that competes in the British Universities and Colleges Sport league, with the addition of other professional and semi-professional players based in the region. The Loughborough University team dates back to the 1950s and having won the British Championships on eleven occasions. The team's head coach is Mark Jarram, who assists the coaching team of the Leicester Riders, with whom Loughborough have a player development pathway.

Honours
 Men's National Cup Winners: 2018-19 (1) 
 Men's Division 1 League Champions: 2017-18 (1)

Players

Current roster

Notable former players

 Harrison Gamble

Season-by-season records

See also
Leicester Riders (men)
Leicester Riders (women)

References

External links
Official website

Basketball teams in England
2011 establishments in England
Basketball teams established in 2011
Sport in Loughborough
Loughborough University